Artena is a town and comune in the Metropolitan City of Rome, Italy. It is situated in the northwest of Monti Lepini, in the upper valley of the Sacco River.

The economy is based on agriculture, animal husbandry and tourism.

History
The name of the original village of the Volsci is uncertain; Ecetra or Fortinum are possible suggestions.

The modern village was called Monte Fortino until 1873. It owes its present name to an unproven identification of the site with the ancient Volscian Artena, destroyed in 404 BC. Another Artena, which was an Etruscan town belonging to the district of Caere, and laying between it and Veii, was destroyed in the period of the kings, and its site is unknown.

In the Middle Ages Artena was a fief of the Counts of Tusculum and then the Counts of Segni, who held its castle until 1475 when, after request of Charles VIII of France, it was assigned to the Colonna. Due to the latter's anti-papal stance, Artena was ravaged several times by papal armies (1526, 1543 and 1557).

Main sights
Within the walls are traces of buildings, and a massive terrace which supported some edifice of importance. This terraced settlement (Piano della Cività) later was the site of a Roman villa.

Other sights include the Palazzo Borghese (17th century), and the churches of Santa Maria delle Letizie,  Santa  Croce, Santo Stefano Protomartire and San Francesco.

Twin towns
 Alcalá del Río, Spain

References

External links

Cities and towns in Lazio
Italic archaeological sites
Volsci